Devil amongst people (Дьявол среди людей) — is a 1991 Russian science fiction novel by S. Yaroslavtsev about "the time which created monsters".

The hero of the novel, Kim Voloshin, has passed through all horrors of the Soviet time (lost his family during the War, suffered in GULAG, was a liquidator of the Chernobyl disaster) and gained a supernatural ability to kill anyone who tried to hurt him.

1991 novels
1991 science fiction novels
Novels by Arkady and Boris Strugatsky